Homesick for St. Pauli is a 1963 German drama film directed by Werner Jacobs and starring Freddy Quinn, Josef Albrecht and Ullrich Haupt. It was based on a musical by Lotar Olias and Gustav Kampendonk

The film was one of the many foreign films that Jayne Mansfield made in the 1960s, after becoming a star in the late 1950s in films like: The Girl Can't Help It (1956) and Will Success Spoil Rock Hunter? (1957).

The film's sets were designed by the art directors Albrecht Becker and Herbert Kirchhoff. Location shooting took place in New York and Germany. The film was shot in Hamburg in mid-1963.

Synopsis
A German singer who has enjoyed massive success in the United States returns to his hometown, the St. Pauli district of Hamburg.

Cast
 Freddy Quinn as Jimmy Jones
 Josef Albrecht as Theo Steinemann
 Ullrich Haupt as Bob Hartau
 Erna Sellmer as Mutter Steinemann
 Beppo Brem as Seppl
 Bill Ramsey as Jack
 Jayne Mansfield as Evelyne
 Christa Schindler as Rosie Becker
 Hein Riess as Kuddel
 Heiner Holl as Manager Harry
 Charles Palent as Rotkäppchen
 Addi Münster as Wirt

References

External links

1963 films
1960s musical drama films
German musical drama films
West German films
Films set in Hamburg
Films set in New York City
1960s German-language films
Films shot in Hamburg
Films shot in New York City
Films directed by Werner Jacobs
Films about singers
Films based on musicals
Constantin Film films
1963 drama films
1960s German films